A Soviet republic, a republic ruled by soviets (workers' councils), may refer to one of the following:
Bolshevik Russia and the Russian SFSR after the Russian Revolution of 1917 and during the Russian Civil War;
The Soviet Union as a whole;
Any of the Republics of the Soviet Union;
Any of several short-lived communist revolutionary governments that were established after the Russian Revolution under its influence:
Arbeiter- und Soldatenräte (Workers' and Soldiers' Councils) during the German Revolution of November 1918, including Bremen (January–February 1919), Braunschweig, Würzburg, Bavaria (April–May 1919) and Alsace (8–22 November 1918).
Bukharan People's Soviet Republic, its name later changed to the Bukharan Soviet Socialist Republic (October 1920–February 1925).
Chinese Soviet Republic, also known as the "Jiangxi Soviet" (November 1931–September 1937) led by the Chinese Communist Party.
Commune of the Working People of Estonia (November 1918–February 1919).
Finnish Socialist Workers' Republic (January–April 1918) in the south of Finland only.
Galician Soviet Socialist Republic (15 July–21 September 1920) in Soviet-occupied territory during the Polish–Soviet War.
Hunan Soviet (ca. 1927) led by the Chinese Communist Party.
Hungarian Soviet Republic (March–August 1919) led by the Hungarian Communist Party.
Limerick Soviet (15–27 April 1919) during a general strike against British military rule.
Other Irish Soviets (1919-1922) mainly in the province of Munster.
Socialist Soviet Republic of Lithuania and Belorussia (February–August 1919).
Persian Socialist Soviet Republic also known as the Soviet Republic of Gilan (June 1920–September 1921).
Republic of Užice (Autumn 1941), a Partisan-governed military state during World War II.
Slovak Soviet Republic (16 June–7 July 1919) directly supported by the Hungarian Soviet Republic.
Soviet Republic of Naissaar (December 1917–February 1918) on an Estonian island in the Baltic Sea.
Lithuanian Soviet Socialist Republic (December 1918–February 1919).
Latvian Socialist Soviet Republic (December 1918–January 1920).
Ukrainian People's Republic of Soviets (December 1917-March 1918).
Ukrainian Soviet Republic (March–April 1918).
Socialist Soviet Republic of Byelorussia (January–February 1919).
The system of government implemented in the Soviet Union and other soviet republics.

See also
Communist state
People's republic
Socialist state
Soviet democracy